The Argentine ambassador in Brussels is the official representative of the Government in Buenos Aires to the European Commission.

List of representatives 

Argentina–European Union relations

References 

European Union
Argentina